Ethel K. Sklar (born March 11, 1928), known as Dusty Sklar, is a New Jersey-based American author and researcher of Nazism. Sklar is a member of the American Society of Journalists and Authors (ASJA) and Investigative Reporters and Editors.

Personal life
Born in Sokół, Poland, she emigrated with her family to the United States in 1930. Her maiden name is Kwalbrun. On November 27, 1949, she married David Sklar; the couple had three children. The marriage ended in divorce in 1988.

Work
 The Nazis and the Occult (1977), 1st Dorset Press edition.
 Gods and Beasts: The Nazis and the Occult (1977), first edition. 180 pp hardcover. T.Y. Crowell Publishing; ; .

References

1928 births
Living people
American people of Polish-Jewish descent
Polish emigrants to the United States
People from Teaneck, New Jersey
Writers from New Jersey